John Carnegie (April 23, 1837 – January 10, 1910) was an Ontario political figure. He represented Peterborough West in the Legislative Assembly of Ontario as a Conservative member from 1867 to 1871 and from 1883 to 1886.

He was born in Douro, Upper Canada in 1837, the son of a Scottish immigrant, and educated in Peterborough and Brantford. He served on the Douro council from 1859 to 1866 and was reeve from 1864 to 1866. He was secretary and treasurer for the agricultural society for Peterborough County. He married Eleanor Hilliard in 1858 and later married Frances Snyder. Carnegie was owner and editor of the Peterboro Review and the Canada Lumberman. He was also a director of the Ontario Mutual Assurance Company. He was defeated by Thomas McCulloch Fairbairn for the Peterborough West seat in 1871. He died in 1910.

His son John Hilliard Carnegie also later served in the provincial assembly.

References

External links

The Canadian parliamentary companion, 1885, JA Gemmill

1837 births
1910 deaths
Progressive Conservative Party of Ontario MPPs